Regina is  a Late Latin feminine name and surname meaning "queen" from the Latin, Italian and Romanian word meaning the same.

Notable persons

Historical
Regina (concubine), 8th century French concubine of Charlemagne
Regina (martyr), 3rd-century French martyr
Regina Basilier (1572–1631), German-Swedish merchant banker
Regina Protmann (1552–1613), Prussian nun
Regina von Siebold (1771–1849), German physician and obstetrician

Musical artists
Regina (Slovenian singer) (born 1965), Slovenian singer
Regina Belle (born 1963), American singer
Regina Richards (born 1954), American singer
Regina Resnik (1922–2013), American operatic singer
Regina Carter (born 1966), American jazz violinist
Regina "Queen" Saraiva (born 1978), Brazilian musician
Regina Spektor (born 1980), Russian-American singer-songwriter
Regina Todorenko (born 1990), Ukrainian singer and television presenter
Elis Regina (1945–1982), Brazilian singer

Actors
Régina Badet (1876–1949), French actress and dancer
Regina King (born 1971), American actress
Regina Hall (born 1970), American actress
Regina Taylor (born 1960), American actress
Regina Cassandra (born 1988), Indian film actress

Athletes
Regina Joyce (born 1957), Irish long-distance runner 
Regina Halmich (born 1976), German boxer 
Regina Kulikova (born 1989), Russian tennis player

Politicians
Regina Asamany (born 1927), Ghanaian politician
Regīna Ločmele-Luņova (born 1966), Latvian politician
Regina Ip (born 1950), Hong Kong politician
 Regina Weiss, American politician

Other professions
Regina Anderson (1901–1993), American writer
Regina Barzilay (born 1971), Israeli computer scientist
Regina Brett (born 1956), American journalist
Regina Benjamin (born 1956), American physician and U.S. Surgeon General
Regīna Ezera (1930–2002), Latvian writer
Regina Jonas (1902–1944), German, the first woman to be ordained as a rabbi
Regina Lopez (1953–2019), Filipina environmentalist and philanthropist known as Gina Lopez
Regina Margareten (1863–1959), Hungarian businesswoman
Regina Martínez Pérez (1963–2012), Mexican journalist
Regina Moran, Irish engineer and business executive
Regina Narva (born 1970), Estonian chess player

Fictional characters
Regina, in the video games Dino Crisis and Dino Crisis 2
Regina Curtis, in Atelier Ayesha: The Alchemist of Dusk
Regina George, in the movie Mean Girls
Regina Grier, on the sitcom The Steve Harvey Show
Regina Linetti, in Brooklyn Nine-Nine
Regina Mills, a main character in the series Once Upon a Time
Regina Phalange, an alias of Phoebe Buffay in the television series Friends
Regina "Reggie" Rocket, in the American animated series Rocket Power
Regina Vasquez, in the series Switched at Birth
Regina, in the Spanish film Volver

See also
Regina (disambiguation)
Regine
Gina (given name)

References

English feminine given names
Latin feminine given names

cs:Vegina
da:Regina
de:Regina (Vorname)
es:Regina
it:Regina (nome)
he:רג'ינה
la:Regina (nomen)
hu:Regina
nl:Regina (voornaam)
ja:Regina
no:Regina (navn)
nn:Regine
pl:Regina (imię)
pt:Regina
rm:Regina
ru:Regina
sk:Regína
sl:Regina (ime)
sr:Регина (име)
fi:Regina
sv:Regina